Auchterarder railway station served the village of Auchterarder near Gleneagles in the Scottish county of Perth and Kinross.

History 
Opened by the Scottish Central Railway, then by the Caledonian Railway, it became part of the London, Midland and Scottish Railway during the Grouping of 1923. Passing on to the Scottish Region of British Railways on nationalisation in 1948, it was then closed by the British Transport Commission in 1956.

References

Notes

Sources 
 
 
 
 Auchterarder station on navigable O. S. map
 Disused stations

External links
 RAILSCOT on Scottish Central Railway

Disused railway stations in Perth and Kinross
Railway stations in Great Britain opened in 1848
Railway stations in Great Britain closed in 1956
Former Caledonian Railway stations